Sajith de Silva (born 12 August 1998) is a Sri Lankan cricketer. He made his first-class debut for Kurunegala Youth Cricket Club in Tier B of the 2017–18 Premier League Tournament on 5 January 2018.

References

External links
 

1998 births
Living people
Sri Lankan cricketers
Kurunegala Youth Cricket Club cricketers
People from Matale